Choctaw is a city in Oklahoma County, Oklahoma, United States. It is the oldest chartered town in Oklahoma Territory. The city is located approximately 10 miles (16.1 km) east of Oklahoma City and is part of the Oklahoma City metropolitan area.

Choctaw became a community in 1890, but was not given actual status as a town until 1893 when a territorial governor was appointed for Oklahoma. It officially celebrated its 100th anniversary in 1993.
In 1950, Choctaw was in an agricultural area. It had a population of 355 in that year. Despite its name, the town has no cultural, historical or governmental ties to the Choctaw Nation of Oklahoma. The tribal headquarters and casino are located in the southeastern part of the state in Durant, Oklahoma, and the Choctaw Capitol Building and annual Labor Day Festival are in Tuskahoma, Oklahoma.

Before Choctaw was chartered, the area included a part of William McClure's 7C Ranch and was known for a trading post and a camping spot near a spring.

A community emerged on the east  of land John S. Muzzy claimed in the 1889 land run and received a postal designation in early 1890.

The town incorporated in April 1904. When Oklahoma became a state in 1907, the town had 230 residents, four churches, a school, a bank, a newspaper and telephone service. By 1909, the town had three gins. The population grew very little during the Great Depression.

Geography

Its latitude and longitude is (35.482383, -97.267330).

Ecoregion and Tourism Region 
Choctaw is located in the Cross Timbers ecoregion and the Frontier Country tourism region.

Climate
Choctaw has a humid subtropical climate (Köppen climate classification Cfa) and lies in an area known as Tornado Alley characterized by frequent interaction between cold and warm air masses producing severe weather. An average of 54 tornadoes strike the state per year.

Demographics

2000 census
At the 2000 census, there were 9,377 people, 3 households and 2,808 families residing in the city. The population density was 346.4 per square mile (133.7/km). There were 3,617 housing units at an average density of 133.6 per square mile (51.6/km). The racial makeup of the city was 88.80% White, 1.64% African American, 3.70% Native American, 0.62% Asian, 0.06% Pacific Islander, 0.85% from other races, and 4.32% from two or more races. Hispanic or Latino of any race were 2.79% of the population.

There were 3,450 households, of which 35.9% had children under the age of 18 living with them, 68.0% were married couples living together, 9.5% had a female householder with no husband present, and 18.6% were non-families. 16.2% of all households were made up of individuals, and 6.0% had someone living alone who was 65 years of age or older. The average household size was 2.69 and the average family size was 2.99.

25.9% of the population were under the age of 18, 7.6% from 18 to 24, 28.7% from 25 to 44, 27.3% from 45 to 64, and 10.6% who were 65 years of age or older. The median age was 38 years. For every 100 females, there were 96.7 males. For every 100 females age 18 and over, there were 94.1 males.

The median household income was $49,291 and the median family income was $55,437. Males had a median income of $36,540 versus $27,914 for females. The per capita income for the city was $21,041. About 3.7% of families and 5.9% of the population were below the poverty line, including 9.0% of those under age 18 and 6.1% of those age 65 or over.

City government

The City of Choctaw has a city council made up of elected officials and led by a mayor. A council-appointed city manager runs the day-to-day administration of the city and oversees city staff. Individual departments such as the police department and fire department are overseen by a police chief and fire chief, respectively.

Arts and culture
The owners of the Old Germany Restaurant, a business opened on March 1, 1976, worked with the city and the chamber of commerce to hold an annual, eight-day Oktoberfest event featuring German food, beer, wine and dancing.

In April 2018, Old Germany Restaurant closed its doors for good after 42 years of business. Mike Turek, the owner of the restaurant, announced that the annual Oktoberfest event would be cancelled for good, as well.

Two months after closing, Old Germany Restaurant reopened its doors after finding investors to help keep the business open. It also hosted the annual Oktoberfest for a 4-day run.

The town has a small museum dedicated to beer steins, the Stramski Collection.

Education
Choctaw contains a career technology school, the Eastern Oklahoma County Technology Center, and a number of schools in the Choctaw-Nicoma Park School District.

Choctaw High School's Varsity Academic Team is ranked 1st in Oklahoma as of 2017 and has been invited to multiple national-level competitions after winning the 6A State Championship in February 2017.

Choctaw public schools spend $4,133 per student. The average school expenditure in the U.S. is $6,058. There are about 15 students per teacher in Choctaw.

Students graduating from Choctaw High School also have the opportunity to take advantage of the "Ticket to Rose" program at Rose State College. Ticket to Rose provides a scholarship for tuition and mandatory fees for all graduates of Choctaw High School.

Notable people 
 Josh Blackburn, former professional ice hockey goalie
 Lyle Boren, father of David L. Boren and former U.S. Congressman
 Joe Dickinson, former college football coach
 Gary Haught, former MLB pitcher
 Louis L'Amour, author
 Becka Leathers, wrestler
 Ryan Merriman, actor

References

External links
 City of Choctaw
 Everett, Dianna. "Choctaw (City)," Encyclopedia of Oklahoma History and Culture, Oklahoma Historical Society, 2009. Accessed March 25, 2015. 
 Choctaw Times

Oklahoma City metropolitan area
Cities in Oklahoma
Cities in Oklahoma County, Oklahoma
Populated places established in 1890
1890 establishments in Oklahoma Territory